Vaginismus is a condition in which involuntary muscle spasm interferes with vaginal intercourse or other penetration of the vagina. This often results in pain with attempts at sex. Often, it begins when vaginal intercourse is first attempted.

The formal diagnostic criteria specifically requires interference during vaginal intercourse and a desire for intercourse. However, the term vaginismus is sometimes used more broadly to refer to any muscle spasms occurring during the insertion of some or all types of objects into the vagina, sexually motivated or otherwise, including the usage of speculums and tampons.

The underlying cause is generally a fear that penetration will hurt. Risk factors include a history of sexual assault, endometriosis, vaginitis, or a prior episiotomy. Diagnosis is based on the symptoms and examination. It requires there to be no anatomical or physical problems and a desire for penetration on the part of the woman.

Treatment may include behavior therapy such as graduated exposure therapy and gradual vaginal dilatation. Surgery is not generally indicated. Botulinum toxin (botox), a muscle spasm treatment, is being studied. There are no epidemiological studies of the prevalence of vaginismus. Estimates of how common the condition is vary. One textbook estimates that 0.5% of women are affected. However, rates in clinical settings indicate that between 5–17% of women experience vaginismus. Outcomes are generally good with treatment.

Signs and symptoms
Physical symptoms may include burning, and sharp pain or pressure in and around the vagina upon penetration. Psychological symptoms include increased anxiety. Pain during vaginal penetration varies.

Causes

Primary vaginismus
Vaginismus occurs when penetrative sex or other vaginal penetration cannot be experienced without pain. It is commonly discovered among teenage girls and women in their early twenties, as this is when many girls and young women first attempt to use tampons, have penetrative sex, or undergo a Pap smear. Awareness of vaginismus may not happen until vaginal penetration is attempted. Reasons for the condition may be unknown.

A few of the main factors that may contribute to primary vaginismus include:
 chronic pain conditions and harm-avoidance behaviour
 negative emotional reaction towards sexual stimulation, e.g. disgust both at a deliberate level and also at a more implicit level
 strict conservative moral education, which also can elicit negative emotions

Primary vaginismus is often unknown cause.

Vaginismus has been classified by Lamont according to the severity of the condition. Lamont describes four degrees of vaginismus: In first degree vaginismus, the person has spasm of the pelvic floor that can be relieved with reassurance. In second degree, the spasm is present but maintained throughout the pelvis even with reassurance. In third degree, the person elevates the buttocks to avoid being examined. In fourth degree vaginismus (also known as grade 4 vaginismus), the most severe form of vaginismus, the person elevates the buttocks, retreats and tightly closes the thighs to avoid examination. Pacik expanded the Lamont classification to include a fifth degree in which the person experiences a visceral reaction such as sweating, hyperventilation, palpitations, trembling, shaking, nausea, vomiting, losing consciousness, wanting to jump off the table, or attacking the doctor.

Although the pubococcygeus muscle is commonly thought to be the primary muscle involved in vaginismus, Pacik identified two additionally-involved spastic muscles in people who were treated under sedation. These include the entry muscle (bulbocavernosum) and the mid-vaginal muscle (puborectalis). Spasm of the entry muscle accounts for the common complaint that people often report when trying to have intercourse: "It's like hitting a brick wall".

Secondary vaginismus 
Secondary vaginismus occurs when a person who has previously been able to achieve penetration develops vaginismus. This may be due to physical causes such as a yeast infection or trauma during childbirth, while in some cases it may be due to psychological causes, or to a combination of causes. The treatment for secondary vaginismus is the same as for primary vaginismus, although, in these cases, previous experience with successful penetration can assist in a more rapid resolution of the condition. Peri-menopausal and menopausal vaginismus, often due to a drying of the vulvar and vaginal tissues as a result of reduced estrogen, may occur as a result of "micro-tears" first causing sexual pain then leading to vaginismus.

Mechanism
Specific muscle involvement is unclear, but the condition may involve the pubococcygeus muscle, levator ani, bulbocavernosus, circumvaginal, or perivaginal muscles.

Diagnosis
The diagnosis of vaginismus, as well as other diagnoses of female sexual dysfunction, can be made when "symptoms are sufficient to result in personal distress." The DSM-IV-TR defines vaginismus as "recurrent or persistent involuntary spasm of the musculature of the outer third of the vagina that interferes with sexual intercourse, causing marked distress or interpersonal difficulty".

Treatment 

A Cochrane review found little high quality evidence regarding the treatment of vaginismus in 2012. Specifically it is unclear if systematic desensitisation is better than other measures including nothing.

Psychological
According to a 2011 study, those with vaginismus are twice as likely to have a history of childhood sexual interference and held less positive attitudes about their sexuality, whereas no correlation was noted for lack of sexual knowledge or (nonsexual) physical abuse.

Physical

Often, when faced with a person experiencing painful intercourse, a gynecologist will recommend reverse Kegel exercises and provide some additional lubricants. Although vaginismus has not been shown to affect a person's ability to produce lubrication, providing additional lubricant can be helpful in achieving successful penetration. This is due to the fact that women may not produce natural lubrication if anxious or in pain. Achieving sufficient arousal during foreplay is crucial for the release of lubrication which can contribute to the ease of sexual penetration and pain-free intercourse.

Though strengthening exercises such as Kegel exercises were previously considered to be a helpful intervention for pelvic pain, new research suggests that these exercises, which function to strengthen the pelvic floor, may not be helpful or may make conditions that are caused by over-active muscles such as vaginismus worse. Exercises that stretch or relax the pelvic floor may be a better treatment option for vaginismus.

To help develop a treatment plan that best fits the needs of their patient, a gynecologist or general practitioner may refer a person experiencing painful intercourse to a Pelvic floor physical therapist or occupational therapist. These therapists specialize in the treatment of disorders of the pelvic floor muscles such as vaginismus, dyspareunia, vulvodynia, constipation, and fecal or urinary incontinence. After performing a manual exam both internally and externally to assess muscle function and to isolate possible trigger points for pain or tightness on the muscles, pelvic floor physical or occupational therapists develop a treatment plan consisting of muscle exercises, muscle stretches, dilator training, electrostimulation, and/or biofeedback interventions. Treatment of vaginismus often involves the use of Hegar dilators (sometimes called vaginal trainers), progressively increasing the size of the dilator inserted into the vagina. The technique is used to practice conscious diaphragmatic breathing (breathing in deeply allowing one's belly to expand) and allowing the pelvic floor muscles to lengthen during inhale; then exhale, bringing belly in and repeat. Research suggests pelvic floor physical or occupational therapy is one of the safest and most effective treatments for vaginismus.

Neuromodulators
Botulinum toxin A (Botox) has been considered as a treatment option, under the idea of temporarily reducing the hypertonicity of the pelvic floor muscles. Although no random controlled trials have been done with this treatment, experimental studies with small samples have shown it to be effective, with sustained positive results through 10 months. Similar in its mechanism of treatment, lidocaine has also been tried as an experimental option.

Anxiolytics and antidepressants are other pharmacotherapies that have been offered to people in conjunction with other psychotherapy modalities, or if these people's experience high levels of anxiety from their condition. Evidence for these medications, however, is limited.

Epidemiology 
There are no epidemiological studies of the prevalence of vaginismus. Estimates of how common the condition is varies. A 2016 textbook estimated about 0.5% of women are affected, while rates in Morocco and Sweden were estimated at 6%.

Among those who attend clinics for sexual dysfunction, rates may be as high as 12 to 47%.

See also

 Hymen
 Penis captivus
 Vulvodynia

References

Further reading
 

Noninflammatory disorders of female genital tract
Gynaecologic disorders
Midwifery
Wikipedia medicine articles ready to translate
Sexual dysfunctions
Sexual health
Women's health